Brinkman House may refer to:

The former Sherman House Hotel, Chicago, Illinois, demolished in 1973.  It was known originally as Brinkman House.
Otto Brinkmann House, Comfort, Texas, NRHP-listed
Richardson-Brinkman Cobblestone House, Clinton, Wisconsin, NRHP-listed